Geographic magazine may refer to:

Africa Geographic
Asian Geographic
Australian Geographic
Canadian Geographic
Chinese National Geography
Géographica
Geographical (magazine), from the United Kingdom
Icelandic Geographic
National Geographic (magazine), from the United States
New Zealand Geographic

See also
 Arizona Highways
 Journal of the Royal Geographical Society of London, a scholarly geographic journal